Beatrice of Burgundy (1257 – October 1, 1310) was a ruling Lady of Bourbon in 1288-1310 and, through her mother, heiress of all Bourbon estates. 

She was the daughter of John of Burgundy (son of Hugh IV, Duke of Burgundy) and Agnes of Dampierre, Lady of Bourbon. In 1272 Beatrice married Robert, Count of Clermont and their eldest son Louis I, le Boiteux became the first Duke of Bourbon.

Issue
Robert and Beatrice had the following children:
Louis I, le Boiteux (1279–1342), first Duke of Bourbon
Blanche (1281–1304), married in 1303 in Paris Robert VII, Count of Auvergne and Boulogne, grandmother of Joan I, Countess of Auvergne
John (1283–1322), Baron of Charolais, married c. 1309 Jeanne d'Argies and had issue
Mary (1285–1372, Paris), Prioress of 
Peter (1287 – aft. 1330), Archdeacon of Paris
Margaret (1289–1309, Paris), married firstly in 1305 Raymond Berengar of Andria (who died in 1307) and secondly in 1308 John I, Marquis of Namur

Physical Appearance
Ottone and Acerbo Morena in their Historia Frederici I described Beatrice as "[O]f medium height, her hair shone like gold, her face most beautiful..."

References

See also
Dukes of Bourbon family tree

1257 births
1310 deaths
House of Burgundy
Bourbon, Lady of, Beatrix of Burgundy
House of Bourbon (France)
13th-century women rulers
14th-century women rulers
13th-century French people
13th-century French women
14th-century French people
14th-century French women